Cherak may refer to:
 Cherak-e Bala, Hormozgan Province
 Cherak-e Pain, Hormozgan Province
 Cherak, North Khorasan, a village in Iran
 Mohamed Cherak, Algerian journalist